Ransom Aldrich "Ram" Myers, Jr. (13 June 1952 – 27 March 2007) was a world-renowned American-Canadian marine biologist and conservationist.

Born in Lula, Mississippi, he was the son of cotton planter, Ransom Aldrich Myers, Sr. and Fay A. Mitchell Myers. At age 16, in 1968, Myers won an international science fair for building an "X-ray crystallograph," which measured the symmetry of atoms.

Myers graduated with a B.Sc. in physics from Rice University in 1974. He earned an M.Sc. in mathematics and a Ph.D. in biology from Dalhousie University in Nova Scotia, Canada. Before joining the faculty of Dalhousie University in 1997 as the first Killam Chair in Ocean Studies, he was a research scientist at the Canadian Department of Fisheries and Oceans in St. John's, Newfoundland and Labrador.

Myers was best known for his warnings about the worldwide overfishing of the fish stocks in the oceans, in particular, the Atlantic cod and Southern bluefin tuna. As a member of the International Union for Conservation of Nature and Natural Resources (IUCN) shark specialist group, he collected data about the decline of shark populations and brought media attention to threatened shark species. One of Myers' most important areas of research was stock recruitment: collection and analysis of data and the subsequent development of models to predict the survival rate for fish larvae.

In the October 2005 issue of Fortune, Myers was listed among the world's ten people to watch for "working to develop new and better ways to husband the wealth beneath the sea."

He died in Halifax, Nova Scotia, aged 54, from a brain tumor.

Notes

References
 Ransom Aldrich Myers (1952-2007) by Daniel Pauly, Nature, 10 May 2007
 Finding aids at his fonds at Dalhousie University

External links
Ransom Myers legacy site
Dalhousie University: In memoriam
The Chronicle-Herald: Obituary
The Chronicle-Herald: Ransom A. Myers and the uses of fame
The Guardian: Marine Scientist Ransom Myers Dies

1952 births
2007 deaths
Deaths from brain tumor
Canadian conservationists
Canadian marine biologists
Fisheries scientists
Dalhousie University alumni
Academic staff of the Dalhousie University
People from Lula, Mississippi
Rice University alumni
Deaths from cancer in Nova Scotia
20th-century Canadian zoologists
American emigrants to Canada